Gregory Alan Ballard (born November 20, 1954) is an American politician, author, and businessman who served as the 48th mayor of Indianapolis, Indiana. He is a retired Lieutenant Colonel from the United States Marine Corps.

On November 6, 2007, he defeated two-term incumbent Democratic Mayor Bart Peterson by 51% to 47%. It was described as one of the biggest upsets in the political history of Indiana. He was re-elected to the position in 2011 by the same margin.

Early life, education, and military service

Ballard was born at Methodist Hospital of Indianapolis to Duard and Mary Ballard. He was born and raised in the city. He graduated from Cathedral High School, a Roman Catholic school. Ballard earned a bachelor's degree in Economics from Indiana University Bloomington. Ballard became a member of Delta Tau Delta.

After graduating, he joined the United States Marine Corps. He continued his education while serving in the Marines, becoming a distinguished graduate of the Marine Corps Command and Staff College, and attained a master's degree in military science from the Marine Corps University, which included operations analysis studies. While stationed in California, he met his future wife Winnie. He later was transferred to Okinawa, Japan.

He served in the first Gulf War. His military career culminated in his service with the United States European Command in Stuttgart, Germany, where he retired in 2001 with 23 years of service. While in the service, he earned numerous awards, including the Legion of Merit, the Meritorious Service Medal, the Kuwait Liberation Medal, the Marine Corps Expeditionary Medal, the Humanitarian Service Medal, and the Military Outstanding Volunteer Service Medal.

Business career
Beginning in 2001, Ballard worked for Bayer in Indianapolis, before becoming self-employed as a leadership and management consultant. He authored and self-published The Ballard Rules: Small Unit Leadership.  He has also taught seminars at the Indiana Business College.

Mayor of Indianapolis

Elections
2007

Ballard was the only Republican to file for mayor, as few members of the city's once-dominant Republican Party were willing to run against Peterson. Ballard was dramatically outspent by Peterson. He had only $300,000 in campaign funds and low name recognition when he began the race.

In comparison, Peterson already had $2.9 million in April while Ballard had only $9,560 at the time.

As late as October 14, Ballard had run no television ads. An October 19 campaign finance report showed that Peterson had raised $1.5 million since April and still had that much on hand to spend.  At that point, Ballard had only $51,000 left, meaning Peterson had 30 times the funds that Ballard had during the last three weeks of the campaign.

On November 6, 2007, Ballard defeated incumbent Mayor Peterson 50%–47%, a difference of 5,312 votes. Unhappiness with rapidly increasing taxes and crime were seen as the biggest reasons for Peterson's defeat. Republicans also recaptured control of the City-County Council for the first time in four years. In his acceptance speech, Ballard told the audience he considers this campaign "the classic, if not the ultimate, example of grassroots politics."

2011

Ballard won re-election to a second term, defeating former Deputy Mayor Melina Kennedy, 51%–47%.

Mayoralty

Ballard was sworn into office on Tuesday, January 1, 2008, at the Indiana War Memorial, in downtown Indianapolis. Ballard chose this site saying that it honored the men and women of the armed services. Ballard said his first act as mayor would be to put the Indianapolis Metropolitan Police Department back under mayoral control, instead of its then-current control by Marion County Sheriff Frank J. Anderson.

The Ballard administration took steps to sell the city's water and wastewater utilities to Citizens Energy Group and spend the $450 million the city received in return on street repair.
Improvements included paving, resurfacing, new sidewalks, more greenways, and bridge repair.

On September 9, 2010, Ballard announced the first batch of projects in the city's RebuildIndy initiative. The $55 million package of street, sidewalk and bridge projects is spread around the city, with many side streets selected for resurfacing as well as some major roads. Ballard also announced a $2 million set of projects that will improve traffic flow and pedestrian access in targeted areas along Michigan Road from Cold Springs Road to 86th Street—a stretch with few sidewalks—and along 71st Street and Westlane Road in the same area. The projects kick off an aggressive infrastructure improvement program. The mayor's office anticipates spending more than $500 million on such projects in coming years, largely funded by proceeds from the pending sale of the city's water and sewer systems to Citizens Energy Group, a nonprofit trust, and stimulus money. The utilities transfer is awaiting approval from the Indiana Utility Regulatory Commission after winning the City-County Council's OK earlier this year. Among its selling points for Ballard is the money to fund infrastructure improvements—though Ballard has said the city's needs are so great that the money won't cover them all.

On August 19, the City of Indianapolis announced it has received $13.8 million more than originally expected from a bond issue secured by the pending sale of its water and sewer utilities to Citizens Energy Group. The bond proceeds of $153.8 million compare with $140 million originally anticipated as one of the chunks of money from selling the utilities. The money is to be spent on street, bridge, and sidewalk projects, under the city's “RebuildIndy” program. That would bring total proceeds from selling the utilities—before subtracting fees and other costs related to the sale—to $504.4 million, from $490.6 anticipated when the City-County Council approved the sale.

In October 2008, Ballard announced the creation of the city's first Office of Sustainability and unveiled the SustainIndy initiative. The community-wide plan is focused on taking local action to be more environmentally conscious. Kären Haley leads the office. In August 2010, Ballard and the Office of Sustainability announced a program that provides incentives for property owners and developers to renovate or construct new buildings in a sustainable manner.

On December 12, 2012, Ballard signed Executive Order #6, making Indianapolis the first major city in the United States to commit to the conversion of its entire municipal non-police fleet to electric or plug-in hybrid vehicles. The mayor also outlined a plan to convert the entire city government vehicle fleet to post-oil technology by 2025. Ballard cited concern over the compromises to national security created by national oil dependence as the reasoning behind this step in energy security. Ballard stated that his team was working with automakers to have the Indianapolis Metropolitan Police Department serve as technical advisors and test drivers to accelerate the creation of the first plug-in hybrid police vehicle that meets the needs of a modern urban police force. Such a fleet could save up to $10 million per year.

Personal life
Ballard is married to Winnie Ballard, together they have a son and a daughter. He is an avid golfer.

Bibliography

 The Ballard Rules: Small Unit Leadership. Bloomington, IN: Authorhouse;

References

External links

 Official mayoral site
 Campaign website

1954 births
Living people
United States Marine Corps personnel of the Gulf War
Indiana Republicans
Indiana University Bloomington alumni
Mayors of Indianapolis
Recipients of the Legion of Merit
United States Marine Corps officers
21st-century American politicians